Lusitanops cingulatus is a species of sea snail, a marine gastropod mollusc in the family Raphitomidae.

Description

Distribution
This species occurs in the North Atlantic Ocean.

References

 Bouchet P. & Warén A. (1980). Revision of the North-East Atlantic bathyal and abyssal Turridae (Mollusca: Gastropoda). Journal of Molluscan Studies Suppl. 8: 1-119
 Gofas, S.; Le Renard, J.; Bouchet, P. (2001). Mollusca. in: Costello, M.J. et al. (eds), European Register of Marine Species: a check-list of the marine species in Europe and a bibliography of guides to their identification. Patrimoines Naturels. 50: 180-213.

External links
 MNHN, Paris: holotype
 
 Gastropods.com: Lusitanops cingulatus
 Intergovernmental Oceanographic Commission (IOC) of UNESCO. The Ocean Biogeographic Information System (OBIS)

cingulatus
Gastropods described in 1980